Honi Soit is the seventh solo studio album by Welsh rock musician John Cale, released in March 1981 by A&M Records, and was his first studio album in six years following 1975's Helen of Troy. It was recorded and mixed by Harvey Goldberg at CBS Studios, East 30th Street and Mediasound in New York City with the intention of making a more commercial album with record producer Mike Thorne at the helm, Thorne would soon be known for his work with Soft Cell. "Dead or Alive" was the only single released from the album but it did not chart. However, Honi Soit is Cale's only studio album to date to chart on the US Billboard 200, peaking at No. 154.

In 1991, Universal re-released the album on CD. It only held the songs from the original LP. This same version of the album has been reissued twice: in 2004 and 2018.

Content
All of the tracks on Honi Soit were written by John Cale, except for "Streets of Laredo", a traditional song arranged by Cale about a dying cowboy telling his story to another cowboy. The track "Need Your Loving" was left off the album in favour of "Riverbank".

American artist Andy Warhol suggested that the album should be called John and Yoko, and provided the cover art, in black and white, but against Warhol's wishes Cale colorized it, a decision recounted by Cale on the song "A Dream" from his 1990 collaboration album with Lou Reed about Warhol, Songs for Drella. In a tongue-in-cheek allusion to the song "Fighter Pilot", the credits on the sleeve give each of the musicians a mock military aviation role, with Cale described as "flight surgeon". The album's title is an abbreviation of the phrase "Honi soit qui mal y pense" (French: "shame upon him who thinks evil of it"), the motto of the British chivalric Order of the Garter.

Critical reception

Robert A. Hull of Creem wrote that "Once again on Honi Soit – from the opening trumpet blast of "Dead or Alive" to the final pounding of the drums on "Magic & Lies" – Cale evokes the epochal – this time as a series of battles, as a pure declaration of war. Like Lou Reed's Street Hassle, it's a work on which the artist finally reveals himself, concealing his tracks yet at the same time blowing his cover." Stephen Holden of the New York Times called the album "excellent", and described Cale as "one of the godfathers of new-wave music, [who] has accomplished the seemingly impossible feat of reconciling the ferocity of postpunk rock with the stateliness of European classicism."

In a retrospective review for AllMusic, critic Mark Deming said that "Honi Soit rivals Fear as the most lividly uncomfortable album in Cale's catalog, and that's saying something."

Track listing

Personnel
Credits are adapted from the Honi Soit liner notes.

Musicians
 John Cale ("flight surgeon") – lead vocals; guitar; keyboards; viola
 Jim Goodwin ("gunner") – keyboards; synthesizer; backing vocals
 Sturgis Nikides ("hellcat") – guitar; backing vocals
 Robert Medici ("navigator") – drums; backing vocals
 Peter Muny ("wing and prop") – bass guitar; backing vocals
 John Gatchell – trumpet
 Bomberettes (members of Mo-dettes) – backing vocals on "Fighter Pilot"

Production and artwork
 Mike Thorne – producer ("computer processing")
 Harvey Goldberg – recording; mixing
 Carl Beatty – engineer
 Harold Tarowsky – assistant engineer
 Jane Friedman – management ("propaganda")
 John Vogel – graphic design
 Andy Warhol – cover concept
 Fred Lorey – photography
 Warren Frank – "flight engineer"
 Louis Tropia – "logistics"

See also
 List of albums released in 1981
 John Cale's discography

References

External links
 
 Interview with Mike Thorn, producer of Honi Soit

1981 albums
John Cale albums
A&M Records albums
Albums produced by Mike Thorne
Albums recorded at CBS 30th Street Studio
Albums with cover art by Andy Warhol